Dmytro Mykolayovych Ianchuk or Yanchuk (born 14 November 1992) is a Ukrainian sprint canoeist. He is the 2016 Olympic bronze medalist in the C-2 1000 metres event, the 2015 World bronze medalist in C-2 500 metres, and the 2015 European champion in C-2 1000 m. Ianchuk competes together with Taras Mishchuk.

Ianchuk took up canoeing in 2004 following his brother. He has a degree in health studies from the Khmelnytskyi National University.

References

External links

 Ukrainian Canoe Federation

Ukrainian male canoeists
Living people
ICF Canoe Sprint World Championships medalists in Canadian
1992 births
Sportspeople from Khmelnytskyi, Ukraine
Canoeists at the 2016 Summer Olympics
Canoeists at the 2020 Summer Olympics
Olympic canoeists of Ukraine
Olympic bronze medalists for Ukraine
Olympic medalists in canoeing
Medalists at the 2016 Summer Olympics
European Games competitors for Ukraine
Canoeists at the 2015 European Games
Canoeists at the 2019 European Games
Universiade medalists in canoeing
Universiade gold medalists for Ukraine
Universiade silver medalists for Ukraine
Recipients of the Order of Merit (Ukraine), 2nd class
Recipients of the Order of Merit (Ukraine), 3rd class
Medalists at the 2013 Summer Universiade
21st-century Ukrainian people